Tarascon station (French: Gare de Tarascon) is a railway station in Tarascon, Provence-Alpes-Côte d'Azur, southern France.

History
The first station was built on the site in 1848. The building and surrounding infrastructure were heavily bombed by the Allies during the Second World War in 1944. The passenger building was refurbished in 1960, and a service building was constructed at the site. An existing annex at the station was demolished and the passenger shelter was torn down and rebuilt, also in 1960. "In 1960, the SNCF entrusted the company Michel et Jauffret of Miramas with this work: refurbishment of the passenger building; construction of a service building; demolition of an annex building; demolition of the passenger shelter; reconstruction of a more modest shelter. The firm carried out the work at a cost of 341 178.17 francs (1960 value)."

Services
Tarascon is served by TER Provence-Alpes-Côte-d'Azur and TER Occitanie.

Within TER Occitanie, it is part of lines 6 (Narbonne–Marseille), 21 (Narbonne–Avignon) and 22 (Portbou–Avignon).

References

Railway stations in Bouches-du-Rhône
Railway stations in France opened in 1847
Tarascon